The Sisters of Mercy is a religious institute of Catholic women founded in 1831 in Dublin, Ireland, by Catherine McAuley. As of 2019, the institute had about 6200 sisters worldwide, organized into a number of independent congregations. They also started many education and health care facilities around the world.

History

Founding
The Congregation of the Sisters of Mercy began when Catherine McAuley used an inheritance to build a large house on Baggot Street, Dublin, as a school for poor girls and a shelter for homeless servant girls and women. She was assisted in the works of the house by local women. There was no idea then of founding a religious institution; McAuley's plan was to establish a society of secular ladies who would spend a few hours daily in instructing the poor. Gradually the ladies adopted a black dress and cape of the same material reaching to the belt, a white collar and a lace cap and veil.

In 1828, Archbishop Daniel Murray advised Miss McAuley to choose some name by which the little group might be known, and she chose that of "Sisters of Mercy", having the design of making the works of mercy the distinctive feature of the institute. She was, moreover, desirous that the members should combine with the silence and prayer of the Carmelite, the active labors of a Sister of Charity. The position of the institute was anomalous, its members were not bound by vows nor were they under a particular rule.

Archbishop Murray asked the Sisters of Mercy to declare their intentions as to the future of their institute, whether it was to be classed as a religious congregation or to become secularized. The associates unanimously decided to become religious. It was deemed better to have this congregation unconnected with any already existing community.

On the Octave of the Ascension 1829 the archbishop blessed the chapel of the institution and dedicated it to Our Lady of Mercy. This combination of the contemplative and the active life necessary for the duties of the congregation called forth so much opposition that it seemed as though the community, now numbering twelve, must disband; but it was settled that several of the sisters should make their novitiates in some approved religious house and after their profession return to the institute to train the others to religious life.

The Presentation Sisters, whose rule was based on the Rule of St. Augustine, seemed best adapted for the training of the first novices of the new congregation and Miss McAuley, Miss Elizabeth Harley, and Miss Anna Maria Doyle began their novitiate at George's Hill, Dublin, on 8 September 1830. While they were in training, Miss Frances Warde managed the affairs of the Baggot Street house.

On 12 December 1831, Catherine McAuley, Mary Ann Doyle, and Mary Elizabeth Harley professed their religious vows as the first Sisters of Mercy, thereby founding the congregation. In 1839 Mary Francis Bridgeman professed her vows and joined the Order.

Expansion

In the 10 years between the founding and her death on 11 November 1841, McAuley had established additional independent foundations in Ireland and England: Tullamore (1836), Charleville (1836), Carlow (1837), Cork (1837), Limerick (1838), Bermondsey, London (1839), Galway (1840), Birr (1840), and St Mary's Convent, Birmingham (1841), and branch houses of the Dublin community in Kingstown (1835) and Booterstown (1838).

The Sisters offered free schools for the poor, academies for the daughters of the rising middle class, and “houses of mercy”, providing shelter for poor youth and women in Dublin and other cities who were in danger of being exploited. They were called upon by bishops in several major epidemics of cholera to nurse people in homes and in the public hospitals.

Their services were in much demand. McAuley opened the first Convent of Mercy in England at Bermondsey on 19 November 1839 for the education of children and the visitation of the poor, sick, and needy. Mother Mary Clare Moore was appointed Superior. The convent was designed in the 'Gothic Style' by Augustus Pugin, his first purpose-designed religious community building. It was destroyed during World War II.

In May 1842, at the request of Bishop Fleming, a small colony of Sisters of Mercy crossed the Atlantic to found the congregation at St. John's, Newfoundland. The sisters arrived in Perth, Australia in 1846, and in 1850, a band from Carlow arrived in New Zealand. Sisters from Limerick opened a house in Glasgow in 1849. In 1860, St Catharine's Convent was founded in Edinburgh. In 1868, the English community established houses in Shrewsbury and Guernsey.

In the United States, the first community of Sisters of Mercy was established in Pittsburgh, Pennsylvania in 1843; followed by Providence, Rhode Island in 1851.

Crimean War
With the London Times reporting appalling conditions at the front, the War Office appealed for volunteer nurses. On 14 October  1854, Bishop Thomas Grant, of Southwark approached the Sisters at Bermondsey. Together with other nuns, six Bermondsey Sisters of Mercy, including Mary Bernard Dickson, travelled to Crimea to work under Nightingale.

Boer War 
At the request of the bishop of Mahikeng, Dr Anthony Gaughran, sisters came to South Africa to found convents there. Mother Superior Teresa Cowley led a group from the convent in Strabane, with the group acting as nurses to the military during the siege of Mahikeng.

Mercy International Association
In 1992 leaders of the various congregations formed the "Mercy International Association" to foster collaboration and cooperation. The Mercy International Centre is located in Dublin. Members of the Association are:
 Sisters of Mercy of the Americas
 Institute of the Sisters of Mercy of Australia
 Sisters of Mercy of Great Britain
 Congregation of the Sisters of Mercy (Ireland)
 Nga Whaea Atawhai o Aotearoa Sisters of Mercy New Zealand
 Sisters of Mercy of Newfoundland
 Religious Sisters of Mercy (Philippines)

Vows and activities
Sisters of Mercy is an international community of Roman Catholic women religious vowed to serve people who suffer from poverty, sickness and lack of education with a special concern for women and children. Members take vows of poverty, chastity, and obedience, the evangelical counsels commonly vowed in religious life, and, in addition, vows of service.

They continue to participate in the life of the surrounding community. In keeping with their mission of serving the poor and needy, many sisters engage in teaching, medical care, and community programs. The organization is active in lobbying and politics.

Constitution
The Sisters of Mercy are constituted as religious and charitable organizations in a number of countries. Mercy International Association is a registered charity in Ireland.

Controversies

In 1869 Sister of Mercy Susan Saurin brought suit against her superiors accusing them of bullying, assault and imprisonment, and claiming £5,000 in damages. The "Great Convent Case" opened at Westminster Hall with heightened press interest given Victorian antipathy to all things Catholic. The Daily Telegraph made a special publication on the "Inner Life of the Hull Nunnery Exposed" to cover the trial. Saurin won her case and was awarded fifty pounds in damages.

In May 2009, the institute was among four congregations of religious women that have come under scrutiny and criticism for their part in running Magdalene laundries in decades past, where women were brought by the state or their families for being unmarried and pregnant, or for other reasons. The report found that girls supervised by orders of nuns, chiefly the Sisters of Mercy, suffered much less sexual abuse but instead endured frequent assaults and humiliation.

The Mercy Sisters have noted they were not compensated for caring for the women and that the laundries were not profit-making ventures. "We acknowledge fully the limitations of the service we provided for these women when compared with today's standards and sincerely wish that it could have been different. We trust that the implications of the changed context are understood by the wider society."

In 2011, as part of their Sculpture Trail initiative, the Ennis Tidy Towns Committee erected a statue at the site of the old St. Xavier's Primary School, now the Clare Museum. Created by Barry Wrafter, it was commissioned to celebrate the work of the Sisters of Mercy since their coming to the town in 1854. In light of the controversy regarding the Magdalen laundries, RTE listeners were divided whether the statue should remain.

Schools founded or run by Sisters of Mercy

Australia

Canada
 Academy of Our Lady of Mercy, St. John's, Newfoundland
 St. Augustine's Elementary School, St. John's, Newfoundland
 St. Bride's College, St. John's, Newfoundland

Ireland

Jamaica
 Convent of Mercy "Alpha" Academy, Kingston 
 St. John Bosco Boys Home, Mandeville
 Mount Saint Joseph Preparatory School, Mandeville

New Zealand
In 1849 Bishop Pompallier visited St Leo's Convent in Carlow, Ireland, seeking sisters to emigrate; eight left from St Leo's, led by Mother Mary Cecilia. They travelled to New Zealand, learning Māori along the way, establishing the Sisters of Mercy in Auckland as the first female religious community in New Zealand in 1850.

Philippines

 Holy Infant College, Tacloban City
 Assumption Academy, Tanauan, Leyte
 Cathedral School of La Naval, Naval, Biliran 
 Holy Cross High School, Camp Philips, Bukidnon

United Kingdom

United States
Holy Family Holy Name School, New Bedford, MA 
Mount Aloysius College, Cresson, Pennsylvania
 Mount Mercy University, Cedar Rapids, Iowa
Immaculate Conception Cathedral School, Memphis, Tennessee
Mercyhurst University, Erie, Pennsylvania
 Little Flower School, Reno, Nevada
 Mount de Sales Academy (Georgia), Macon, Georgia
 Saint Xavier University, Chicago, Illinois
St. Vincent's Academy, Savannah, Georgia
Mount Mercy Academy, Buffalo
Mount Saint Mary Academy, Manchester, New Hampshire
Notre Dame High School, Lawrenceville, New Jersey
St. Mary Academy - Bay View, Riverside, Rhode Island
Our Lady of Mercy School for Young Women, Rochester, New York Our Lady of Mercy School | Rochester NY Private School | Grade 6 - 12
Merion Mercy Academy, Merion Station, Pennsylvania
Misericordia University, Dallas, Pennsylvania
 Gwynedd Mercy University, Gwynedd Valley, Pennsylvania
 Mount Saint Mary Academy, Watchung, NJ
 Mercymount Country Day School, Cumberland, RI Home - Mercymount Country Day School
 Carlow University, Pittsburgh, Pennsylvania
 Salve Regina University Newport, Rhode Island
St. Peter’s Catholic School, San Francisco, CA
 Mother McAuley Liberal Arts High School, Chicago, Illinois
 Assumption High School, Louisville, Kentucky
 Mercy Academy, Louisville, Kentucky
 Little Flower School, Brooklyn, New York
 Catherine McAuley H.S. for girls, Brooklyn, New York
 Notre Dame High School, Elmira, New York
 Walsingham Academy, Williamsburg, Virginia
 Georgian Court University, Lakewood, NJ

Hospitals and healthcare work

Australia 
 Mater Misericordiae Hospital, Brisbane
 Mater Misericordiae Hospital, Bundaberg
 Mater Misericordiae Hospital, Gladstone
 Mater Misericordiae Hospital, Mackay
 Mater Misericordiae Hospital, Rockhampton
 Mater Misericordiae Hospital, Townsville
 Mater Misericordiae Hospital, North Sydney

Canada 
 St.Clare's Mercy Hospital, St. John's

Ireland 
 Mater Misericordiae University Hospital, Dublin
 National Rehabilitation Hospital (Dublin)

Philippines 
 Mother of Mercy Hospital, Tacloban

Sisters of Mercy of the Americas
Michael O'Connor was born in Cobh, Ireland. In June 1841, O'Connor was appointed Vicar General of Western Pennsylvania, and two years later, Bishop of the newly constituted Diocese of Pittsburgh. He traveled to Rome for his consecration and on his return, stopped in Ireland to recruit clergy for his new diocese, obtaining eight seminarians from St. Patrick's College, Maynooth, and seven Sisters of Mercy from Carlow, Ireland. The sisters arrived in Pittsburgh in December 1843, with Frances Warde as superior. Mercy Hospital in Wilkes-Barre, Pennsylvania opened 1898.

In 1858, Mother Mary Teresa Maher led a group of ten Sisters of Mercy to Cincinnati from Kinsale, Ireland. In 1892, the eleven Sisters of Mercy came to Cincinnati at the invitation of Archbishop John Baptist Purcell. They soon opened a Night School for Young Women. Mercy Hospital in Hamilton, Ohio was founded in 1892. Mother of Mercy High School was founded in 1915. They also direct Bethany House Services for homeless women and children.

By the 1920s there were 39 separate Sisters of Mercy congregations across the United States and Latin America. In 1929 the "Sisters of Mercy of the Union" was founded, merging many of the congregations into one single entity with nine provinces. Seventeen communities remained independent. A federation of all the Mercy congregations was formed and in the 1970s, a common constitution was developed. Further work toward consolidation continued, and in July 1991, the "Sisters of Mercy of the Americas was established". In December 2018, the sisters marked 175 years in the United States. (The Religious Sisters of Mercy of Alma, Michigan developed from the Sisters of Mercy in 1973 and remains a separate congregation.)

In July 2017 "Mercy Education System of the Americas" (MESA) was formally established to unite and serve the Mercy education ministries in Argentina, Belize, Guam, Honduras, Jamaica, the Philippines and the United States.

Education

Secondary schools

Colleges and universities

Defunct

Belize
 St. Catherine Academy, Belize City
 Muffles College (Secondary School in Orange Walk Town)
 Muffles Junior College (Associate degree-offering institution)

Honduras
Instituto María Regina (La Ceiba, Honduras)

Healthcare
The Sisters founded dozens of hospitals in the United States, and sponsors, or co-sponsors, six health systems. The organization also operates health care ministries in Belize, Guam, Guyana, Peru and the Philippines.

In 1892, they founded Mercy Hospital in Hamilton, Ohio. "With lots of heavy industry in Hamilton at the time, there was a lot of need for emergency care for accident victims."

In 1893, they founded Mercy Hospital in Des Moines, Iowa

In 1916, the Sisters of Mercy established Sisters of Mercy's St. Joseph's Sanitarium, in Asheville, North Carolina, to treat tuberculosis patients, which later became St. Joseph's Hospital. In 1998, St. Joseph's Hospital was sold to Memorial Mission Hospital. The Sisters continue to operate urgent care centers in the Asheville area, under the name Sisters of Mercy Urgent Care.

Mercy Health is an NPO Catholic healthcare organization in the Midwestern United States, and is headquartered in the suburban western St. Louis County suburb of Chesterfield, Missouri.

Healthcare systems
Healthcare systems sponsored by, co-sponsored by, or with historical ties to the Sisters of Mercy of the Americas include:
AMITA Health
Mercy, St. Louis, Missouri
Mercy Ceder Rapids, Cedar Rapids, Iowa
Mercy Iowa City, Iowa City, Iowa
Mercy Medical Center Baltimore, Maryland
Mercy Urgent Care, Asheville, North Carolina
Northern Light Mercy Hospital, Portland, Maine
Scripps Mercy Hospital, San Diego
St. Joseph's/Candler Health System, Savannah
Trinity Health 
Catholic Health, Buffalo
Holy Cross Hospital, Fort Lauderdale
UPMC Mercy, Pittsburgh

See also 
 Magdalen Asylum
 Nora Wall

References

Further reading
 Connolly, Mary Beth Fraser. Women of Faith: The Chicago Sisters of Mercy and the Evolution of a Religious Community (Oxford University Press, 2014)
 Herron, Mary Eulalia (Sr.). ''The Sisters Of Mercy In The United States 1843-1928", (The Macmillan Company, 1929)

External links
 

 
Catholic nursing orders
Catholic female orders and societies
Christian charities based in the United Kingdom
Charities based in the Republic of Ireland
Salve Regina University
Catholic religious institutes established in the 19th century
1831 establishments in the United Kingdom
Catholic hospital networks in the United States